Gerard Joseph Taets van Amerongen (July 18, 1914 – April 21, 2013) was a politician and lawyer from Alberta, Canada.

He was born in 1914 in Winnipeg and grew up in Edmonton.  He graduated in law from the University of Alberta. He first ran for the Legislative Assembly of Alberta in the 1955 provincial election, as the Progressive Conservative candidate in the Edmonton district. He finished 18th on the first ballot and was eliminated in transfers.

He ran in the next three provincial general elections in various districts and was defeated each time.  He was first elected in the 1971 provincial election in the district of Edmonton-Meadowlark. He was appointed Speaker and held that position until 1986 when he was defeated in his riding by Grant Mitchell, who later became leader of the Alberta Liberal Party.

Amerongen was the second sitting speaker to be defeated in Alberta but the first sitting speaker to be defeated while his party retained a majority government.

He operated a law firm in Edmonton until 2007.

References

Bibliography

External links
Gerard J. Amerongen law firm
Legislative Assembly of Alberta list of Speakers
"Speaker's Ruling" by Gerard Amerongen: Canadian Parliamentary Review Vol. 8 No. 4 1985
B.C. Legislature guest introduction, Gerard J. Amerongen February 3, 1977
Ontario Legislature Guest introduction June 11, 1985
Gerard Amerongen decision to recognize Grant Notely opposition leader over Raymond Speaker
 

1914 births
2013 deaths
Politicians from Edmonton
Politicians from Winnipeg
Progressive Conservative Association of Alberta MLAs
Speakers of the Legislative Assembly of Alberta
University of Alberta alumni